Papeda, or bubur sagu, is an Indonesian congee  made from sago starch that is a staple food of the indigenous people in eastern Indonesia, namely parts of Sulawesi, Maluku Islands and Papua. It is also widespread in Papua New Guinea and serves as a counterpart of central and western Indonesian cuisines that favour rice as their staple food.

The starch is acquired by felling the trunk of a sago palm tree, cutting it in half, and scraping the soft inner parts of the trunk, the pith, producing a crude sago pith flour. This flour is then mixed with water and squeezed to leach the starch from the flour. The still-moist sago starch is usually stored in a container made of sago palm leaflets, called tumang, in which it will keep for several months before spontaneous fermentation will turn it too acidic and unsuitable for making papeda. Depending on the variety and the growing conditions, it may take a sago tree five to over ten years to accumulate enough starch in its trunk to make the effort of extracting it worthwhile.

Papeda is made by cooking sago starch with water and stirring until it coagulates. It has a glue-like consistency and texture. Sayur bunga pepaya (papaya flower bud vegetables) and tumis kangkung (stir-fried water spinach) are often served as side-dish vegetables to accompany papeda.

In southern Sulawesi mainly Luwu and Tana Toraja, Kapurung is made from cooked sago congee which is picked up using chopsticks or fork and rolled into a ball. Usually it is served with beans, vegetable and fish in a soup. While in Southeast Sulawesi, specifically from Tolaki tribe, Sinonggi, sago congee is served separately from the side dishes more akin to Papeda. It needs to be picked up by specially designed wooden sticks.

There are similar dishes in Malaysia, where it is called , part of the Melanau cuisine in the East Malaysia state of Sarawak, and in Brunei, where it is called ambuyat.

History 
On some coasts and lowlands on Papua, sago is the main ingredient to all the foods. Sagu bakar, sagu lempeng, and sagu bola, has become dishes that is well known to all Papua, especially on the custom folk culinary tradition on Mappi, Asmat and Mimika. Papeda is one of the sago foods that is rarely found. The anthropologist and the leader of Papua institution research, Johszua Robert Mansoben, stated that Papeda is known more in the tradition of the native folks of  Sentani and Abrab by the Lake Sentani area, Arso, and Manokwari.

Menu variations 
In general, papeda is consumed with mackerel and fish broth, but it can be replaced with red snapper, tuna, or cork fish. Most of these fishes are spiced with turmeric and lime, giving a distinctive yellow color on the broth. Papeda is sometimes also consumed with boiled starchy tubers, such as those of cassava or yam. Besides yellow broth and fish, papeda can be enjoyed with sayur gameno, which is made from young melinjo leaves, stir-fried papaya flowers and red chilies.

See also

 Ambuyat, a similar Bruneian dish
 List of porridges
 Kissel

References

Porridges
Staple foods
Vegetarian dishes of Indonesia
Indonesian cuisine
Papua New Guinean cuisine